Werkok is a  boma in  Makuach payam, Bor Central County, Jonglei State, South Sudan, about 13 kilometers north-east of Bor.  Since 2016, it has served as the county headquarters for Bor Central County.

Demographics
According to the Fifth Population and Housing Census of Sudan, conducted in April 2008, Werkok  boma had a population of 8,713 people, composed of 4,737 male and 3,976 female residents.

Governance
On several occasions in 2006, 2008, and 2009, during his time as Governor of Jonglei, Kuol Manyang Juuk proposed relocating the Bor County Headquarters from Bor Town to Werkok as a security measure.

Notes

References 

Populated places in Jonglei State